Rafael Ramon (born March 14, 1984) better known by his stage name JUMZ is an American rapper. He is of Dominican descent, hailing from Washington Heights, Manhattan.

Early life 

He was raised in the predominantly Dominican section of Manhattan, Washington Heights and went to Norman Thomas H.S.

Career 

In 2006, JUMZ debuted his first LP "SIGN JUMZ" thru his imprint Paid It In Pain which was distributed independently. The album underperformed at the mainstream level due to lack of promotions but the following single "Satisfy" became one of JUMZ's biggest hits to date.

In December 2007, JUMZ announced   his first ever European Tour, My Head Is Swollen Tour. At his return from Europe, he unveiled  his new video "Paid It In Pain" which was shot in Paris, France and has garnered him accolades from music industry heads. As a result, SESAC, one of the three leading performance rights organizations in the US, has offered JUMZ a publishing deal.

Also, he recently was featured by celebrity portraiture photographer Kelly Kline in her portfolio which include music and sports entertainment's biggest names such as Reggie Bush, T.I., Rev Run, LeBron James, and Amar'e Stoudemire among others.

Discography 

Mixtapes Albums
Independent's Day (Big White Tee Music) (2012)
Stonewater (2010)
 Back From 95  (2008)
 Sign JUMZ  (2006)

Mixtapes Appearances

 2011 Get Your Buzz Up Vol. 3
 2010 DJ Dyber Talk's Cheap
 2010 DJ N.O. For The Streets Vol.2
 2009 East Coast Bad Boys
 2008: DJ Guttaman presents KILL TAPEZ, volume3
 2008: DJ Guttaman & Phase 5 present F*CK ya label, volume 1

Album appearances

References

External links 
Websites

JUMZ @ Our Stage 
Casting Call for JUMZ's new single I'M FLOSSIN' 

Interviews
 Da Doo-Dirty Show Interview with JUMZ 
 EXIT Interview with JUMZ 

1984 births
Rappers from Manhattan
American rappers of Dominican Republic descent
Hispanic and Latino American rappers
Living people
People from Washington Heights, Manhattan
21st-century American rappers